Keith Walcott (8 March 1924 – 11 July 2006) was a Barbadian cricketer. He played in fifteen first-class match for the Barbados cricket team from 1940 to 1952. Walcott was also a vice-president of Barbados Cricket Association.

See also
 List of Barbadian representative cricketers

References

External links
 

1924 births
2006 deaths
Barbadian cricketers
Barbados cricketers
People from Saint Michael, Barbados